Miss Grand United States 2022 was the fifth edition of the Miss Grand United States pageant, held on June 23, 2022, at Copernicus Center, Chicago. Twelve candidates chosen through state pageant or national casting competed for the title, of whom the representative of Colorado, Emily DeMure, was announced the winner. She then represented the country in the Miss Grand International 2022 in Indonesia, but got a non-placement.

The contest was hosted by Paola Cossyleon and Alexandria Kelly, and held in parallel with Miss Eco International and Miss Eco Teen International, in which the winners of the Miss Eco categories later participated at the international contests in Egypt.

Results

Final placement

Special awards

Contestants
12 State titleholders competed for the national title.

References

External links

Official Website
 

Miss Grand United States
Grand United States 2022
2022 in the United States